The state forests of Alabama are maintained by the Alabama Forestry Commission.

Current state forests

Former state forests

See also
 List of U.S. National Forests

External links
 Alabama Forestry Commission

Lists of state forests in the United States